The 19th Korean Music Awards ceremony was held at Nodeul Live House, Nodeulseom, Seoul, on March 1, 2022, and was streamed online. It recognised the best music released in South Korea between December 2020 and November 2021. It was hosted by the Korean Music Awards Selection Committee and sponsored by the Ministry of Culture, Sports and Tourism and the Korea Creative Content Agency.

Criteria
Unlike other South Korean music awards, the Korean Music Awards are based not on record sales but on musical achievement. The winners were determined by the Korean Music Awards Selection Committee, a panel composed of music critics, radio show producers, academics and other music industry professionals.

Winners and nominees
The nominees for the 19th Korean Music Awards were announced on February 9, 2022. Folk singer Lang Lee was the most nominated artist with six nominations, followed by Aespa, IU and AKMU with four. BTS was nominated for the fifth consecutive year. For the first time, K-pop artists were nominated in independent categories, having previously been nominated in the pop and dance/electronic categories.

Main awards
Winners are listed first, highlighted in boldface, and indicated with a double dagger (‡). Nominees are listed in alphabetical order.

Special awards
 Achievement Award – Devils
 Selection Committee Special Award – Han Kyung-rok, Korea Jazz Guard

References

2022 in South Korean music
2022 music awards
March 2022 events in Asia